Epaminondas is a children's story that was originally a folk tale that was orally transmitted in the black community of the Southern States of the United States. A little boy who is named Epaminondas makes a series of amusing mistakes which are caused when he does the right thing at the wrong time, or they are caused when he takes metaphorical language literally. The humor derives from the problem of miscommunication between adults and children. The story was first published in 1911, and it quickly became popular. The 1911 book has been widely criticized for racial stereotyping, and later versions of it have attempted to rectify this.

Sara Cone Bryant, 1911
The first printed version of the story was entitled Epaminondas and His Auntie, by Sara Cone Bryant and illustrated by Inez Hogan. It was first published in 1911.

As with Helen Bannerman's The Story of Little Black Sambo, which was originally written about a boy from Southern India but was later illustrated in many printings with stereotypes of African Americans, the Epaminondas books have been criticized as having racist overtones and stereotypes.

In 1941, Bryant's text was reprinted by Harrap with new illustrations by Honor C. Appleton and Patten Wilson.

Later versions

Later versions of the tale were published by Constance Egan, Eve Merriam, Mary Claire Pinckney and Cathy East Dubowski.
In one Spanish version, the illustrations show Epaminondas as a white child.

See also

References

External links 
 Copy of the text

1911 children's books
American picture books
Children's fiction books
Anti-black racism in the United States
Stereotypes of African Americans